Josia auriflua is a moth of the  family Notodontidae. It is found in South America, from Bolivia to French Guiana (including the western Andes in Colombia and Ecuador).

External links
Species page at Tree of Life project

Notodontidae of South America
Moths described in 1864